Tyrinthia klugii is a species of beetle in the family Cerambycidae. It was described by James Thomson in 1868. It is known from Colombia.

References

Hemilophini
Beetles described in 1868